This is a list of universities in Cook Islands.

Universities 
 Takamoa Theological College
 University of the South Pacific - Cook Islands campus
 Cook Islands Tertiary Training Institute

See also 
 List of universities by country

References

 
Universities
Cook Islands
Cook Islands

Lists of organisations based in the Cook Islands